A. A. Watts may refer to:

Alaric Alexander Watts (1797–1864), British poet and journalist
Alaric Alfred Watts (1825–1901), British clerk and spiritualist
Alf Watts (1862–1928), British socialist

See also 
Watts (surname)